Christian Falocchi (born 30 January 1997) is an Italian male high jumper, national champion at senior level in the high jump indoor in 2022

Biography
He was 13th at 2017 European Athletics Indoor Championships and won the silver medal at the 2017 European Athletics Indoor Championships. In February 2017, at age 20, he improved his Personal Best of 10 cm, bringing him from 2.15 m to 2.25 m This exploit has made it to the 27th place in end-of-season 2017 world-class lists.

He won the 2018 Mediterranean Athletics U23 Championships with the Championships record.

Personal best
High jump indoor: 2.25:  Ancona, 4 February 2017
High jump outdoor: 2.24:  Bydgoszcz, 15 July 2017

Progression
Outdoor

Indoor

Achievements

References

External links
 

1997 births
Living people
Italian male high jumpers